Mutiny at Fort Sharpe (Italian: Per un dollaro di gloria) is a 1966 Italian-Spanish western film directed by Fernando Cerchio and starring Broderick Crawford, Elisa Montés and Mario Valdemarin. Produced when the boom in Spaghetti Westerns was at its height, it is set during the French Intervention in Mexico.

The film's sets were designed by the art director Giancarlo Bartolini Salimbeni. Location shooting took place in Spain including at Hoyo de Manzanares near Madrid.

Cast
 Broderick Crawford as Colonel Lenox
 Elisa Montés as Brenda
 Mario Valdemarin as Captain Clermont
 Ugo Sasso as Sgt. Ross 
 José Marco as cabo Brandy
 Umberto Ceriani as Southern Medical Lieutenant

References

Bibliography 
 Conway, Christopher. Heroes of the Borderlands: The Western in Mexican Film, Comics, and Music. University of New Mexico Press, 2019.

External links 
 

1966 films
Italian Western (genre) films
Spanish Western (genre) films
1966 Western (genre) films
1960s Italian-language films
Films directed by Fernando Cerchio
Spaghetti Western films
Second French intervention in Mexico films
1960s Italian films

it:Per un dollaro di gloria